The Romanian Superliga is the men's top Romanian professional water polo league.

2021–22 teams
Eight teams take part in the 2021-22 season:
 Crișul Oradea
 CSM Oradea
 Dinamo București
 Politehnica Cluj
 Rapid București
 Sportul Studențesc
 Steaua București
 Hello Sport

Previous winners

Wins by club 
Bold indicates clubs currently playing in 2020–21 season.

References

External links 
 Romanian Water Polo Federation
 H2O polo.ro

Water polo competitions in Romania
Rom
Professional sports leagues in Romania